

1930s 
 Alexander's Ragtime Band (1938)
 Angels with Dirty Faces (1938)
 The Bitter Tea of General Yen (1933)
 The Blue Angel (1930)
 Boys Town (1938)
 The Great Ziegfeld (1936)
 I Am a Fugitive from a Chain Gang (1932)
 The Informer (1935)
 It Happened in Hollywood (1937)
 The Key (1934)
 Manhattan Melodrama (1934)
 The Mummy (1932)
 Mystery of the Wax Museum (1933)
 The Public Enemy (1931)
 The Road Back (1937)
 The Roaring Twenties (1939)
 Scarface (1932)
 Show Boat (1936)
 Vanity Fair (1932)
 Viva Villa! (1934)

1940s 
 Citizen Kane (1941)
 Edison the Man (1940)
 Happy Land (1943)
 Heaven Can Wait (1943)
 It's a Wonderful Life (1946)
 One Foot in Heaven (1941)
 Old Acquaintance (1943)
 The Great Gatsby (1949)
 The Jolson Story (1946)
 The Keys of the Kingdom (1944)
 The Life and Death of Colonel Blimp (1943)
 The Pride of the Yankees (1942)
 Random Harvest (1942)
 The Razor's Edge (1946)
 Roxie Hart (1942)
 The Sin of Harold Diddlebock (1947)
 The Strange Love of Martha Ivers (1946)
 The Treasure of the Sierra Madre (1948)
 Wilson (1944)
 Yankee Doodle Dandy (1942)

1950s 
 Anastasia (1956)
 Auntie Mame (1958)
 Beau James (1957)
 The Buster Keaton Story (1957)
 Cheaper by the Dozen (1950)
 The Court-Martial of Billy Mitchell (1955)
 Giant (1956)
 The Glenn Miller Story (1954)
 Has Anybody Seen My Gal? (1952)
 Houdini (1953)
 Jeanne Eagels (1957)
 Man of a Thousand Faces (1957)
 Shake Hands with the Devil (1959)
 Singin' in the Rain (1952)
 Some Like It Hot (1959)
 The Quiet Man (1952) 
 The Rising of the Moon (1957)
 Show Boat (1951)
 The Spirit of St. Louis (1957)
 The Story of Will Rogers (1952) 
 The Wings of Eagles (1957)
 Valentino (1951)

1960s 
 The Big Bankroll (1961)
 The Blood of Fu Manchu (1968)
 The Carpetbaggers (1964)
 The Castle of Fu Manchu (1969)
 Doctor Zhivago (1965)
 Elmer Gantry (1960)
 The Face of Fu Manchu (1965)
 Funny Girl (1968)
 Gigot (1962)
 Hush… Hush, Sweet Charlotte (1964)
 Inherit the Wind (1960)
 Robin and the 7 Hoods (1964)
 The Sand Pebbles (1966)
 Splendor in the Grass (1961)
 Sunrise at Campobello (1960)
 Thoroughly Modern Millie (1967)
 The Yellow Rolls-Royce (1964)
 The Vengeance of Fu Manchu (1967)

1970s 
 1900 (1976)
 The Boy Friend (1971)
 Caddie (1976)
 F for Fake (1974)
 The Front Page (1974)
 The Godfather Part II (1974)
 The Great Gatsby (1974)
 The Great Waldo Pepper (1975)
 Lady Sings the Blues (1972)
 One of Our Dinosaurs Is Missing (1975)
 The Private Files of J. Edgar Hoover (1977)
 The Twelve Chairs (1970)
 Upstairs, Downstairs (1971-1975)
 W.C. Fields and Me (1976)
 The World's Greatest Lover (1977)
 Valentino (1977)

1980s 
 Agatha Christie's Poirot (1989-2013)
 American Pop (1981)
 Before Stonewall (1984)
 Bloodhounds of Broadway (1989)
 Brideshead Revisited (1981 TV serial)
 Chariots of Fire (1981)
 The Color Purple (1985)
 Divinas palabras (1987)
 Doctor Faustus (1982)
 Gandhi (1982)
 The Last Emperor (1987)
 Matewan (1987)
 A Month in the Country (1987)
 Mussolini: The Untold Story (1985)
 The Natural (1984)
 Once Upon a Time in America (1984)
 Out of Africa (1985)
 A Passage to India (1984)
 Sahara (1983)
 Something Wicked This Way Comes (1983)
 Sunset (1988)
 The Untouchables (1987)
 Wait Until Spring, Bandini (1989)
 Winston Churchill: The Wilderness Years (1981 TV serial)
 The Woman in Black (1989)
 Zelig (1983)

1990s 
 The Babe (1992)
 Balto (1995)
 Bullets Over Broadway (1994)
 Chaplin (1992)
 A Chef in Love (1996)
 The Cider House Rules (1999)
 Enchanted April (1992)
 Evita (1996)
 Fried Green Tomatoes (1991)
 Haunted (1995)
 The House of Eliott (1991-1994)
 The Legend of 1900 (1998)
 Legends of the Fall (1994)
 The Lover (1992)
 Malcolm X (1992)
 Michael Collins (1996)
 Miller's Crossing (1990)
 Mrs. Parker and the Vicious Circle (1994)
 Nixon (1995)
 No Greater Love (1996)
 Porco Rosso (1992)
 RKO 281 (1999)
 Stalin (1992)
 Sweet and Lowdown (1999)
 Timecop (1994)
 The Wooden Man's Bride (1994)

2000s 
 Admiral (2008)
 Agatha Christie's Marple (2004-2013)
 Al sur de Granada (2003)
 Amelia (2009)
 Anarchists (2000)
 The Aviator (2004)
 Balto II: Wolf Quest (2002)
 Balto III: Wings of Change (2004)
 Brideshead Revisited (2008 film)
 Bright Young Things (2003)
 The Cat's Meow (2001)
 Century Hotel (2001)
 Changeling (2008)
 Chicago (2002)
 Cinderella Man (2005)
 Coco Before Chanel (2009)
 Coco Chanel & Igor Stravinsky (2009)
 The Curious Case of Benjamin Button (2008)
 The Fall (2006)
 Frida (2002)
 Fullmetal Alchemist the Movie: Conqueror of Shamballa (2005)
 A Good Woman (2004)
 The Gray Man (2007)
 The Great Gatsby (2000)
 Head in the Clouds (2004)
 Hitler: The Rise of Evil (2003)
 The Hours (2002)
 Leatherheads (2008)
 Letters from Iwo Jima (2006)
 Life with Judy Garland: Me and My Shadows (2001)
 Max (2002)
 Memoirs of a Geisha (2005)
 Monster House (2006)
 The Princess and the Frog (2009)
 Sands of Oblivion (2007)
 Seabiscuit (2003)
 There Will Be Blood (2007)
 The Tracker (2002)
 Two Brothers (2004)
 La Vie en rose (2007)
 Warm Springs (2005)
 The Wind That Shakes the Barley (2006)

2010s 
 Babylon Berlin (2017–)
 Boardwalk Empire (2010-2014)
 Cable Girls (2017-)
 The Crimes of Grindelwald (2018)
 The Danish Girl (2015)
 Derrière les murs (2011)
 Downton Abbey (2010-2015)
 Downton Abbey (2019)
 Fantastic Beasts and Where to Find Them (2016)
 The Great Gatsby (2013)
 The King's Speech (2010)
 Let the Bullets Fly (2010)
 The Lost City of Z (2016)
 Magic in the Moonlight  (2014)
 Midnight in Paris (2011)
 Miss Fisher's Murder Mysteries (2012-2015)
 The Nutcracker in 3D (2010) 
 Panzram (2011)
 Peaky Blinders (2013-)

2020s

 Ma Rainie's Black Bottom (2020)
Interwar Period
1920s